Muhammad Akram is a Pakistani politician who is currently serving as a member of the Senate of Pakistan from Balochistan since March 2018. He belongs to  National Party (NP).

References

Living people
Year of birth missing (living people)
Pakistani senators (14th Parliament)

National Party (Pakistan) politicians